Shangri-La Air was an airline based in Nepal. It partly merged with Necon Air in 2001 and eventually ceased operations in 2008.

History 
The airline started operations in October 1999 with oneDe Havilland Canada DHC-6 Twin Otter aircraft.
Its name is derived from Shangri-La, a fictitious place described in James Hilton's 1933 novel Lost Horizon..

In 2001 Shangri-La Air and Karnali Air were partly merged into Necon Air. Shangri-La Air was operating a fleet of six aircraft, two Beechcraft 1900Ds and four De Havilland Canada DHC-6 Twin Otters. Necon Air took over the Beechcraft, and Shangri-La continued operating the DHC-6s.

In August 2002, after the loss of one DHC-6, the airline operated only two aircraft. In 2007 its fleet consisted of only one DHC-6, until its closure in 2008.

Destinations 
Shangri-La Air regularly served the following destinations, some of which were discontinued before its closure:

It also ran scheduled mountain sightseeing flights from Kathmandu to the Mount Everest range. They usually departed in the early morning hours and returned one hour later.

Fleet 
At the time of closure, Shangri-La Air operated the following aircraft:

Former fleet

Incidents and accidents 
22 August 2002 - 2002 Shangri-La Air Twin Otter Crash

References

External links 
 

Defunct airlines of Nepal
Airlines established in 1999
Airlines disestablished in 2001
1999 establishments in Nepal
2008 disestablishments in Nepal